Tempany Deckert (born 2 March 1978) is an Australian actress and author, who now resides in Los Angeles, California, USA. She is perhaps best known for her role as Selina Roberts on popular soap opera Home and Away from 1994 to 1997, and briefly in 1998.

Early life
Tempany Deckert was born in 1978 in Melbourne, Victoria, Australia. She grew up outside the city of Melbourne with her parents and her older sister, make-up artist Kendal Deckert.  Deckert had originally planned to do her HSC, but with receiving a role on Home and Away, she chose acting and deferred her education, planning to return in the future to finish her studies.

Career
Deckert began her acting career at the age of ten appearing in theatre productions.  She trained at MBCTA youth theatre in Melbourne for six years, until she moved to New York City to extend her training as an adult actor.  She appeared in a guest role in RFDS, and walk-on roles on Neighbours. At the age of 16, Deckert relocated to Sydney as she received a lead role in soap opera Home and Away, playing Selina Cook, which lasted for four years. For her portrayal of Selina, Deckert earned a nomination for the Logie Award for Most Popular Actress in 1996. Deckert's decision to leave Home and Away was for greater fame in the United States, which she has since relocated to, living permanently in Los Angeles, like her former co-stars including Isla Fisher and Melissa George.  Following her departure from the show, she appeared on drama series' All Saints and The Secret Life of Us, before landing a role in her first feature film, New Skin, which starred Anthony Hayes and Jessica Napier. In 2009, Deckert starred in her first American feature film, Oral Fixation.

In theatre, Deckert has appeared in several productions including Away at the Black Swan Theatre Company in Western Australia, and the award-winning Direct from Broadway at The Edge Theatre in Newtown, Sydney.

Deckert is also the author and illustrator of a number of books including The Green-Eyed Monster, Maddy's Big Break, The Big Fudge, a series of books entitled Fashion Police, and Radio Rebels.

Filmography

Film

Television

Works
 The Green-Eyed Monster - Scholastic Press Australia, 2001. 
 The Big Fudge Part of "The Shooting Stars" series published by Scholastic Press in Australia, 2002. 
 Lights ... Camera ... Ghost! ("The Shooting Stars" series) - Scholastic Press Australia, 2002. 
 The Stage Kiss ("The Shooting Stars" series) - Scholastic Press Australia, 2002. 
 Maddy's Big Break - ("The Shooting Stars" series) - Scholastic Press Australia, 
 Understudy to Miss Perfect ("The Shooting Stars" series) - Scholastic Press Australia, 2003. 
 In Your Dreams - Scholastic Education, Laguna Bay Publishing, 2005. 
 Going Batty - Scholastic Education, Laguna Bay Publishing, 2005. 
 Fashion police : the dorky dance dilemma - Tempany Deckert; illustrated by Rae Dale. South Yarra, Vic. : Macmillan Education Australia, 2007. 
 Fashion police : the haunted workroom - Tempany Deckert; illustrated by Rae Dale. South Yarra, Vic. : Macmillan Education Australia, 2007. 
 Fashion police : braving the bully - Tempany Deckert; illustrated by Rae Dale. South Yarra, Vic. : Macmillan Education Australia, 2007. 
 Fashion police : famous fools - Tempany Deckert; illustrated by Rae Dale. South Yarra, Vic. : Macmillan Education Australia, 2007. 
 Radio rebels : radio revolution - Tempany Deckert; illustrated by Coral Tulloch. South Yarra, Vic. : Macmillan Education Australia, 2007. 
 Radio rebels : wiped out - Tempany Deckert; illustrated by Coral Tulloch. South Yarra, Vic. : Macmillan Education Australia, 2007. 
 Radio rebels : blind revenge - Tempany Deckert; illustrated by Coral Tulloch. South Yarra, Vic. : Macmillan Education Australia, 2007. 
 Radio rebels : pug hostage - Tempany Deckert; illustrated by Coral Tulloch. South Yarra, Vic. : Macmillan Education Australia, 2007. 
 Kids Inc Book Series, The Fashion Police Books 1-4 and Radio Rebels Books 1-4 - Macmillan, Australia

References

External links

Australian soap opera actresses
Australian child actresses
1978 births
Living people
Australian expatriates in the United States